Lee Un-ju (born 8 November 1972) is a South Korean lawyer and politician who served as the Member of the National Assembly for Gwangmyeong 2nd constituency from 2012 to 2020. She formerly served as the deputy parliamentary leader of the Democratic Unionist Party in 2012 and the People's Party in 2017.

Biography 
Born in Yeongdo, Busan, Lee grew up in Singapore. She has a degree in French at Seoul National University, and passed the judicial examination in 1997. She was involved in several part-time jobs after her father's business went bankrupt during the economic crisis in 1997. Her mother died in 2011.

During the 2000s, Lee worked as an entrepreneur at S-Oil and Renault Samsung Motors.

Political career 
In early 2012, Lee was brought into the Democratic Unionist Party (then the Democratic Party) by its president, Han Myung-sook. She was nominated as an MP candidate for Gwangmyeong 2nd constituency, and defeated the incumbent Chun Jae-hui of the Saenuri Party. She was re-elected to the same constituency in 2016.

During the 2017 presidential election, Lee criticised Moon Jae-in, the presidential candidate for Democratic Party. On 6 April, she shifted to the People's Party and endorsed its candidate, Ahn Cheol-soo. At that time, the approval rate of Ahn was as high as Moon, after her endorsement by several anti-Moon politicians. Meanwhile, Ahn's approving then dropped and finished as 3rd (21.41%), approximately half of Moon.

Lee unsuccessfully ran for the party president on 27 August. She supported the party's merger with the Bareun Party, and joined the Bareunmirae Party in the early 2018. In November 2018, sources reported that she would join the Liberty Korea Party.

On 23 April 2019, Lee left Bareunmirae.

In the 2020 election, Lee was nominated as the United Future candidate for Busan South 2nd constituency. However, she lost to the Democratic candidate and incumbent MP Park Jae-ho.

2021 Busan mayoral election 
The resignation of the Mayor of Busan Oh Keo-don on 23 April 2020 following the allegations of sexual harassment has provoked the by-election in 2021.

On 17 December 2020, Lee announced her intention to run for the Busan mayorship at Convention Hall of Busan Exhibition and Convention Centre (BEXCO). She cited a sexual harassment controversy related to the former Mayor Oh and indicated that the by-elections must be the "base" of the regime change. The following was her manifesto included in her declaration:
 To combat the COVID-19 pandemic:
 1 million won (≒ ￡640.50) monthly income per person
 Free self-test kits
 Building a new airport (replacing the incumbent Gimhae International Airport) in Gadeok Island
 Establishing a 'happy city for mothers and families'
 Developing Busan as a maritime city
 Administrative, social and cultural innovation

Lee contested PPP preselection on 4 March 2021, but lost to the former MP for Suyeong Park Hyung-joon and the former Deputy Mayor Park Seong-hun.

Public orientation 
Formerly, Lee positioned herself as a centrist. She is now considered part of the Korean far-right, supporting a market economy,  a stronger security policy, and holding a conservative outlook on issues such as immigration. However, she considers herself as centre-right liberal.

Economy 
Lee is a capitalist who supports market economy and opposes the increase of minimum wages and pro-labour policies. She criticised President Moon's economic policy as socialism, and stated that "the US is enjoying prosperity due to capitalism". She does not oppose economic democracy but says that "leftists have ruined its original meaning".

Lee was widely criticised after she called school canteen cooks as "cooking moms".

Immigration 
Lee denounced the Yemeni refugees on Jeju Island as "impostors seeking jobs and money" and opposes them. She said, "South Korean conservatives must ensure the view towards immigration policy". She wants to reduce the number of foreign workers and mentioned that the government should prioritise locals. Lee also advocates for harsher policy for illegal immigrants.

Personal life 
Lee is married to Choi Won-jae, a professor at Kyung Hee University. She gave birth to a son in 2009.

Election results

General elections

References

External links 
 Lee Un-ju on YouTube
 Lee Un-ju on Facebook
 Lee Un-ju on Instagram
 Lee Un-ju on Twitter
 Lee Un-ju on Blog

1972 births
Living people
Right-wing populism in South Korea
21st-century South Korean women politicians
21st-century South Korean politicians
South Korean women lawyers
People from Busan